Genoplesium ectopum, commonly known as the Brindabella spider orchid or ectopic midge orchid and as Corunastylis ectopa in Australia, is a small terrestrial orchid endemic to the Australian Capital Territory. It has a single thin leaf fused to the flowering stem and up to thirty five small, green and reddish purple flowers. It is only known from the Brindabella Range where it grows in Eucalyptus forest.

Description
There is a callus in the centre of the labellum but not extending to its tip. Flowering occurs from January to March.

Taxonomy and naming
Genoplesium ectopum was first formally described in 1999 by David Jones from a specimen collected in the Brindabella Ranges and the description was published in The Orchadian. In 2002, Jones and Mark Alwin Clements changed the name to Corunastylis ectopa. The specific epithet (ectopum) derived from the Ancient Greek word ektopos meaning "out of place".

Distribution and habitat
The Brindabella midge orchid is only known from a single site in the Brindabella Range at an altitude of  where it grows in Eucalyptus forest.

Conservation
The entire population of this midge orchid grows within  of a road embankment prone to erosion. Population estimates range from about 35 following bushfires and drought, to the present at about 110. The main threats to the species are erosion, roadworks, weed invasion, shrub growth and inappropriate use of herbicides. The species is listed as "critically endangered" (CR) under the Environment Protection and Biodiversity Conservation Act 1999 (EPBC Act).

References

External links
 
 

ectopum
Endemic orchids of Australia
Orchids of the Australian Capital Territory
Plants described in 2007